Denis Lalor is a former hurling and Gaelic football player from County Laois in Ireland.

Career
Lalor played on the Laois senior football team throughout the 1990s, primarily as a defender but also in attack. During that period he was widely regarded as one of the top players in the country in his position.  In 1991, he played on the Laois team beaten by Meath in the final of the Leinster Senior Football Championship.  He also won two Railway Cup football medals with Leinster in 1996 and 1997.

Lalor was the captain of his club The Heath in 1993 when they won a memorable Laois Senior Football Championship title. The previous year he had received a Laois Senior Hurling Championship medal with his hurling club, Clonad.

After his senior inter-county career ended Lalor continued to play at club level, while also serving as a selector with the Laois senior football team under Tom Cribbin. He also had spells as club manager with Gracefield in Offaly and his home club, The Heath.  In 2008 he was appointed as manager of the Laois minor football team for the 2009 season.

References
Hoganstand website, October 2008

Year of birth missing (living people)
Living people
Gaelic football managers
Gaelic football selectors
Dual players
Laois inter-county Gaelic footballers
Laois inter-county hurlers
The Heath hurlers
The Heath Gaelic footballers